William Blumberg and Miomir Kecmanović defeated Raven Klaasen and Marcelo Melo in the final, 6–0, 6–1 to win the doubles tennis title at the 2022 Los Cabos Open.

Hans Hach Verdugo and John Isner were the reigning champions, but Isner did not compete this year. Hach Verdugo partnered Hunter Reese, but lost in the first round to Matthew Ebden and Max Purcell.

Seeds

Draw

Draw

References

External links
 Main draw

Los Cabos Open - Doubles